The Day He Arrives (lit. "In the direction of Bukchon" or "Bukchon-bound") is a 2011 South Korean drama film written and directed by Hong Sang-soo. The film is in black and white. It premiered on 19 May 2011 in the Un Certain Regard section of the 64th Cannes Film Festival. The film received 45,223 admissions on its domestic release.

Plot 
Seong-jun heads to Seoul to meet a close friend who lives in Bukchon (North Village), Jongno District. When the friend does not answer his calls, Seong-jun wanders around Bukchon and runs into an actress he used to know. The two talk for a while but soon part. He makes his way down to Insa-dong and drinks makgeolli (rice wine) by himself. Some film students at another table ask him to join them—Seong-jun used to be a film director. He soon gets drunk and heads for his ex-girlfriend's house.

Unclear if it is the next day or some other day, Seong-jun is still wandering around Bukchon. He runs into the actress again. They talk and soon part. He eventually meets his friend and they head to a bar called Novel with a female professor his friend knows. The owner of the bar has a striking resemblance to Seong-jun's ex-girlfriend. He plays the piano for her.

Again unclear if it is the next day or some other day, Seong-jun goes to the Jeongdok Public Library with his friend and mentions that it was the first place he chased after a woman. Later, they have drinks with a former actor who had been doing business in Vietnam. The same female professor joins them and the four go to the bar called Soseol (lit. "Novel"). Seong-jun gets drunk and ends up kissing the owner of the pub.

Seong-jun may have spent a few days in Seoul with his friend, or it may still be his first day there. He may have learned something from the encounter with his ex-girlfriend, or may have to meet the woman who resembles her again, for the first time. As life presents itself in no more than today's worth of time, Seong-jun also has no other choice than to face his "today".

Cast 
 Yoo Jun-sang as Seong-jun, a professor of film studies
 Kim Sang-joong as Young-ho, a film critic and friend of Seong-jun
 Song Seon-mi as Bo-ram, a professor of film studies
 Kim Bo-kyung as Kyung-jin (Seong-jun's ex-girlfriend) / Ye-jeon (bar owner)
 Kim Eui-sung as Joong-won, an ex-actor
 Park Soo-min as an actress 
 Go Hyun-jung as a cinema fan
 Gi Ju-bong as a producer
 Baek Jong-hak as a director 
 Baik Hyun-jhin as a composer 
 Ahn Jae-hong as student 1 
 Bae Yoo-ram as student 2 
 Jeong Ji-hyeong as student 3

Reception
The Day He Arrives holds an 83/100 average on Metacritic.

See also
List of black-and-white films produced since 1970

References

External links 
  
 The Day He Arrives at The Cinema Guild
 
 
 

2011 films
2011 drama films
South Korean independent films
South Korean drama films
Films about film directors and producers
Films about educators
Films set in Seoul
Films shot in Seoul
Films directed by Hong Sang-soo
Sponge Entertainment films
South Korean black-and-white films
2010s Korean-language films
2011 independent films
2010s South Korean films